Lumière University Lyon 2 is one of the three universities that comprise the current University of Lyon, having splintered from an older university of the same name, and is primarily based on two campuses in Lyon itself. It has a total of 27,500 students studying for three-to-eight-year degrees in the arts, humanities and social sciences.

History

At the end of the 18th century, Lyon did not have a university. Education was still linked to religious congregations and influenced by the town's commercial, scientific and industrial requirements.

1835 and 1838 : Creation of the Faculties of Science and Humanities.
1874 and 1875 : Creation of the Faculties of Medicine and Law.
1896 : All these faculties were combined to form the University of Lyon. The same year, the historical buildings on the left bank of the Rhone were finished, initially dedicated to the faculties of medicine and science, then to the faculties of law and humanities. University of Lyon 2 is now established in part of these buildings.
December 1969 : University Lyon 2 was created as a result of the Loi Faure of 1968, according to which each university must be a legally independent establishment. It comprised law, humanities and social sciences. The number of students soon rose significantly. In such a demographic context, the university was extended in Bron, where a new campus was built during the 1970s, its original features included a modular organisation, a street within the university and a landscaped environment. For some years now, it has been part of the developing area of Porte des Alpes near Bron.
1987 : University Lyon 2 was renamed University Lumière Lyon 2. The logo was created by the Art and Design School of Lyon reflecting the university's new ambitions: offering optimal access to the foundations of culture, promoting initiatives and opening itself to the world.

Campuses 

Université Lumière Lyon 2 extends over two main sites:
 Berges du Rhône' campus - a historic site in the centre of Lyon on the left bank of the Rhone, which is also the head office of the university.
 Porte des Alpes, on the south-eastern outskirts of Lyon, in Bron and Saint-Priest which houses the teaching and research premises and the buildings of the polytechnic institute (IUT Lumière) as well as cultural and sports activities.

Courses 
Lyon 2 Lumière University is one of the first universities to have integrated the European higher education scheme right from the start of the academic year 2004. The courses are organised within the scope of the LMD' system (Bachelor's degree - Master's degree - PhD).
Lyon 2 Lumière University offers a variety of courses in 5 fields:

 Humanities and Social Sciences 
 Languages
 Foreign Literatures and Culture
 Applied Modern Languages
 Performing Arts
 Information & Communication
 Latin and Greek
 Modern Literature
 Music
 Psychology
 Cognitive Sciences
 Language Sciences
 Society and Environment
 Public Administration
 Planning
 Anthropology
 Geography
 History
 History of Art and Archaeology
 Education Science
 Political Sciences
 Sociology
 Economics and Management
 Economic and Social Administration
 Econometrics
 Economics and Management
 Law
 Data Science and Machine Learning for Social Sciences and Humanities
 Data Science
 Machine Learning

Digital facilities
Lyon 2 is part of a pilot program on the intensive use of TICE (ITCE, Information and Communication Technology in Education). The digital work environment (fr. ENT) was introduced at the university in 2003.
The Digital Working Environment (ENT) project at Lumière Lyon 2 is part of a national, regional and local drive to accompany, support and assist individuals who make up the academic world (students, lecturers and other university staff) throughout their diverse field of activity; as part of basic training, research, advanced training or simple intellectual curiosity.

The five ENT tool categories include :

 information : 3 portals (administration, staff and students), faculties' Internet sites, Web TV ;
 communication : a virtual office for both individual and team work ;
 pédagogie : on-line training center ;
 documentation : including Encyclopedia Universalis on-line, multi-lingual translator Ultralingua, theoretical resources and library catalogs ;
 e-administration : access to various documents such as regulations, marking breakdowns, certificates, career history for staff

Reputation
The university was ranked 26 out of universities in France and in the 1001-1200 band of world universities by QS World University Rankings 2023. It was also ranked 231 in the world for Arts and Humanities.  It was similarly ranked by the Times Higher Education World University Rankings 2022.

Notable professors

Humanities and Social Sciences 

 Ferdinand Brunot (1860-1938) - linguist and philologist
 Alexandre Matheron (1926-2020) - philosopher
 Mohammed Arkoun (1928-2010) – Algerian intellectual historian of the Islam and philosopher.
 Daniel Babut (1929-2008) - Greek scholar
 Robert Faurisson (1929-2018) – French academic and arts teacher today redeemed, above all known as activist and Holocaust denial author.
 Manfred Kelkel (1929-1999) - musicologist
 Colette Grinevald (born 1947) - linguist
 Gérard Le Vot (born 1948) - musicologist
 Dominique Gonnet (born 1950) - religious scholar
 Marie Anaut (born 1956) - clinical psychologist
 Bernard Lahire (born 1963) – French sociologist, honorary member of the Order of Arts and Letters.
 Tarek Abdallah (born 1975)  - musicologist
 Anne Penesco - musicologist

Society and Environment 

 Xavier de Montclos (1924-2018) - historian of religion
 Thierry Bianquis (1935-2014) - professor of Islamic history and civilisation
 Jean-Claude Goyon (1937-2021) - Egyptologist
 André Pelletier (born 1937) - historian
 Pierre Guichard (1939-2021) -  historian, archeologist, medievalist
 Étienne Fouilloux (born 1941) - historian of religion
 Joseph Yacoub (born 1944) - historian and political scientist
 Roland Étienne (born 1944) - archaeologist
 Philippe Meirieu (born 1949) - politician
 Jacques Berlioz (born 1953) - historian
 Isabelle von Bueltzingsloewen (born 1964) - public health historian
 Anne Hugon (1965) - historian
 Manlio Graziano - political scientist
 Paul Mattei - Roman scholar

Economics and Management 
 Jacques Bichot – French economist, university professor, honorary member of the Economic and Social Council.
 Yves Crozet – French economist, university professor emeritus.
 Dominique Meyer (born 1955) - economist and politician

Law 
 Serge Guinchard (born 1950) - legal scholar

Notable alumni

Academia

 Charles Bonnet (born 1933) - archeologist
 Hammadi Sammoud (born 1946) - Tunisian academic
 Sylvie Granger (1955-2022) - modernist historian
 Marc Gabolde (born 1957) - Egyptologist
 Christian Lorenzi (born 1968) - experimental psychologist
 Lina Gálvez (born 1969) - Spanish economic historian
 Hervé Lacombe - musicologist
 N'Dri Thérèse Assié-Lumumba - Africanist scholar; President of the World Council of Comparative Education Societies

Activist

 Muhammad Loutfi Goumah (1886-1953), Egyptian public figure, essayist, barrister
 Denise Domenach-Lallich (1924-2020) - French resistance activist
 Sima Abd Rabo (born 1976) - Syria civil society activist
 Bruno Julliard (born 1981) - former President of the UNEF, the largest student union in France.

Business
 Jérôme Kerviel (born 1977) - Société Générale trader who incurred one of the largest losses in banking history.

Diplomat
 Jacqueline Marie Zaba Nikiema (born 1957) - Burkina Faso diplomat
 Éric Falt (born 1962) - UNESCO diplomat
 Mahamoud Ali Youssouf (born 1965) - politician and diplomat

Lawyer and judiciary
 Kim Sathavy (born 1954) - Cambodian judge
 Koeut Rith (born 1979) - Cambodian legal expert
 Laurence Boisson de Chazournes - lawyer and professor
 Marie-Anne Cohendet - law and political science

Literature and journalism
 Dhimitër Shuteriqi (1915-2003) - Albanian literary historian, poet, author
 Ezza Agha Malak (born 1942) - novelist and poet
 Khal Torabully (born 1956) - Mauritian poet
 Michèle Léridon (1958-2021) - journalist
 Thierry Frémaux (born 1960) - film critic
 Stéphane Pedrazzi (born 1978) - television journalist

Performing arts
 Kyrie Kristmanson (born 1989) - Canadian singer-songwriter
 Fleur Mino - singer

Politics
 Henri Philippe Pharaoun (1901-1993), Lebanese politician and art collector
 Bedrettin Tuncel (1910-1980) - Turkish politician and academic
 Michel Noir (born 1944) - politician
 Azouz Begag (born 1957) - politician and economist
 Hélène Conway-Mouret (born 1960) - politician and academic
 Jérôme Nury (born 1972) - politician
 Cendra Motin (born 1975) - politician
 Thomas Gassilloud - politician

See also
 University of Lyon
 List of public universities in France by academy

References

External links
Lumière University Lyon 2 - (French) (English)

University of Lyon
Educational institutions established in 1969
1969 establishments in France